Wuzong is the temple name of several Chinese emperors. It may refer to:
 Emperor Wuzong of Tang (814-846), who reigned over Tang China between 840 and 846
 Külüg Khan, Emperor Wuzong of Yuan (1281-1311), who reigned over the Yuan Dynasty between 1307 and 1311
 Zhengde Emperor (1491-1521), of the Ming Dynasty, who served between 1505 and 1521

See also
 Emperor Wu (disambiguation)

Temple name disambiguation pages